This is a list of species in the plant genus Planchonella. 

Planchonella amieuana (Guillaumin) Aubrév. 
Planchonella aneityensis (Guillaumin) H.J.Lam ex Royen 
Planchonella annamensis  Pierre ex Dubard 
Planchonella anteridifera (C.T.White & W.D.Francis ex Lane-Poole) H.J.Lam 
Planchonella arnhemica (F.Muell. ex Benth.) P.Royen 
Planchonella asterocarpon (P.Royen) Swenson, Bartish & Munzinger 
Planchonella australis (R.Br.) Pierre 
Planchonella baillonii (Zahlbr.) Dubard 
Planchonella boninensis (Nakai) Masam. & Yanagih. 
Planchonella brevipes  A.C.Sm. 
Planchonella calcarea (Hosok.) P.Royen 
Planchonella cauliflora  Munzinger & Swenson 
Planchonella chartacea (F.Muell. ex Benth.) H.J.Lam 
Planchonella chrysophylloides ( H.J.Lam 
Planchonella cinerea (Pancher ex Baill.) P.Royen 
Planchonella clemensii (Lecomte) P.Royen 
Planchonella contermina  Pierre ex Dubard 
Planchonella costata (Endl.) Pierre 
Planchonella cotinifolia (A.DC.) Dubard 
Planchonella crassinervia  Dubard 
Planchonella crenata  Munzinger & Swenson 
Planchonella cyclopensis  P.Royen 
Planchonella densinervia (K.Krause) H.J.Lam 
Planchonella dies-reginae P.Royen 
Planchonella dothioensis (Aubrév.) Swenson, Bartish & Munzinger 
Planchonella duclitan (Blanco) Bakh.f. 
Planchonella eerwah (F.M.Bailey) P.Royen 
Planchonella endlicheri (Montrouz.) Guillaumin 
Planchonella ericiflora  Munzinger & Swenson 
Planchonella erringtonii Dubard 
Planchonella euphlebia (F.Muell.) Francis 
Planchonella firma (Miq.) Dubard 
Planchonella firma var. microcarpa (Burck) H.J.Lam 
Planchonella forbesii (S.Moore) H.J.Lam 
Planchonella foxworthyi (Elmer) H.J.Lam 
Planchonella garberi  Christoph. 
Planchonella glauca  Swenson & Munzinger 
Planchonella grandifolia (Wall.) Pierre 
Planchonella grayana  H.St.John 
Planchonella guillauminii  H.J.Lam 
Planchonella hochreutineri  H.J.Lam 
Planchonella howeana (F.Muell.) Pierre 
Planchonella kaalaensis  Aubrév. 
Planchonella kaernbachiana (Engl.) H.J.Lam 
Planchonella kaniensis (K.Krause) H.J.Lam 
Planchonella keyensis  H.J.Lam 
Planchonella koumaciensis  Aubrév. 
Planchonella kuebiniensis Aubrév. 
Planchonella laetevirens (Baill.) Pierre ex Dubard 
Planchonella lamii  P.Royen 
Planchonella lamprophylla (K.Krause) H.J.Lam 
Planchonella latihila  Munzinger & Swenson 
Planchonella lauracea (Baill.) Dubard 
Planchonella ledermannii (K.Krause) H.J.Lam 
Planchonella leptostylidifolia   Guillaumin 
Planchonella lifuana (Baill.) Pierre ex Dubard 
Planchonella longipetiolata (King & Prain) H.J.Lam 
Planchonella luteocostata  Munzinger & Swenson 
Planchonella macropoda   H.J.Lam 
Planchonella maingayi (C.B.Clarke) P.Royen 
Planchonella mandjeliana  Munzinger & Swenson 
Planchonella membranacea  H.J.Lam 
Planchonella micronesica (Kaneh.) Kaneh. ex H.J.Lam 
Planchonella microphylla  Pierre ex Dubard 
Planchonella mindanaensis   H.J.Lam 
Planchonella minutiflora  Munzinger & Swenson 
Planchonella moluccana (Burck) H.J.Lam 
Planchonella monticola (K.Krause) H.J.Lam 
Planchonella myrsinifolia (F.Muell.) Swenson, Bartish & Munzinger 
Planchonella myrsinodendron (F.Muell.) Swenson, Bartish & Munzinger 
Planchonella myrsinoides (A.Cunn. ex Benth.) S.T.Blake ex Francis 
Planchonella nebulicola  H.J.Lam 
Planchonella obovata (R.Br.) Pierre 
Planchonella peekelii (K.Krause) H.J.Lam 
Planchonella petaloides  H.J.Lam 
Planchonella pinifolia (Baill.) Dubard 
Planchonella pohlmaniana (F.Muell.) Pierre ex Dubard 
Planchonella povilana  Swenson & Munzinger 
Planchonella pronyensis  Guillaumin 
Planchonella pyrulifera (A.Gray) H.J.Lam ex Royen 
Planchonella reticulata (Baill.) Pierre ex Dubard 
Planchonella rheophytopsis  P.Royen 
Planchonella rigidifolia (K.Krause) H.J.Lam 
Planchonella roseoloba  Munzinger & Swenson 
Planchonella rufocostata  Munzinger & Swenson 
Planchonella saligna S.Moore 
Planchonella sandwicensis (A.Gray) Pierre 
Planchonella sarcospermoides  H.J.Lam 
Planchonella schlechteri (K.Krause) H.J.Lam 
Planchonella sessilis A.C.Sm. & S.P.Darwin 
Planchonella skottsbergii Guillaumin 
Planchonella smithii (P.Royen) A.C.Sm. 
Planchonella solida P.Royen 
Planchonella spathulataPierre 
Planchonella sphaerocarpa (Baill.) Dubard 
Planchonella suboppositifolia  H.J.Lam 
Planchonella sussu (Engl.) H.J.Lam 
Planchonella tahitensis (Nadeaud) Pierre ex Dubard 
Planchonella tenuipes (K.Krause) H.J.Lam 
Planchonella thiensis  Aubrév. 
Planchonella thyrsoidea C.T.White 
Planchonella torricellensis (K.Schum.) H.J.Lam 
Planchonella umbonata (P.Royen) A.C.Sm. 
Planchonella velutina (Elmer) H.J.Lam 
Planchonella vitiensis Gillespie 
Planchonella vrieseana (Pierre ex Burck) Dubard 
Planchonella wakere (Pancher & Sebert) Pierre 
Planchonella xylocarpa (C.T.White) Swenson, Bartish & Munzinger 
Planchonella yunnanensis C.Y.Wu

References

 
Planchonella